Coffeeville is a town in and one of two county seats of Yalobusha County, Mississippi, United States. The population was 905 at the 2010 census.  It is named after John Coffee (1772 – 1833), a planter and military leader. The minor American Civil War Battle of Coffeeville took place near here in December 1862.

Water Valley, Mississippi, in the northeastern part of the county, is the second county seat and judicial district. Once a center of railroad shops, it is the largest city in the county.

Geography

Demographics

2020 census

As of the 2020 United States census, there were 797 people, 457 households, and 268 families residing in the town.

2000 census
As of the census of 2000, there were 930 people, 401 households, and 261 families residing in the town. The population density was 423.4 people per square mile (163.2/km2). There were 464 housing units at an average density of 211.3 per square mile (81.4/km2). The racial makeup of the town was 54.52% African American, 44.84% White, 0.32% Native American, and 0.32% from two or more races. Hispanic or Latino of any race were 1.83% of the population.

There were 401 households, out of which 25.7% had children under the age of 18 living with them, 38.4% were married couples living together, 21.9% had a female householder with no husband present, and 34.9% were non-families. 32.4% of all households were made up of individuals, and 20.0% had someone living alone who was 65 years of age or older. The average household size was 2.32 and the average family size was 2.93.

In the town, the population was spread out, with 24.8% under the age of 18, 8.2% from 18 to 24, 23.3% from 25 to 44, 24.3% from 45 to 64, and 19.4% who were 65 years of age or older. The median age was 39 years. For every 100 females, there were 74.5 males. For every 100 females age 18 and over, there were 68.8 males.

The median income for a household in the town was $24,712, and the median income for a family was $31,000. Males had a median income of $25,592 versus $20,294 for females. The per capita income for the town was $13,758. About 23.1% of families and 28.5% of the population were below the poverty line, including 44.3% of those under age 18 and 14.5% of those age 65 or over.

Education
The Town of Coffeeville is served by the Coffeeville School District.

References

External links
Coffeeville Website

Towns in Mississippi
Towns in Yalobusha County, Mississippi
County seats in Mississippi